The Precision Machined Products Association (PMPA) is an international trade association which exists to represent the interests of the precision machined products industry.

External links
 Official Website

Manufacturing trade associations